Peter Francis Salmon Cook (8 November 19433 December 2005) was an Australian politician. He served as a Labor member of the Senate from 1983 to 2005, representing the state of Western Australia.

Career

Cook was born in Melbourne, Victoria, and was an active trade unionist before entering politics. He was Secretary of the Western Australian Trades and Labour Council 1975–83 and Vice-President of the Australian Council of Trade Unions 1981–83. He was also a member of the Labor Party's National Executive.

He was elected to the Senate at the 1983 election; as this was a double dissolution election, his service commenced on election day, 5 March 1983 (although for the purpose of determining the rotation of senators it was taken to have commenced on the previous 1 July).

In the Hawke and Keating Labor governments he was Minister for Resources 1988–1990, Minister for Industrial Relations 1990–1993, Minister for Shipping and Aviation Support 1992–93, Minister for Trade 1993–1994 and Minister for Industry, Science and Technology 1994–96.

After the defeat of the Keating government in 1996, Cook was a member of the Opposition Shadow Ministry 1996–2001 and Deputy Leader of the Opposition in the Senate. In 1997–2001, he chaired a Senate Committee inquiry into the proposed Goods and Services Tax.

He was defeated by union organiser Glenn Sterle in a Labor preselection ballot before the 2004 election, and subsequently did not contest the election. His term expired on 30 June 2005. An avid ally of Julia Gillard, Cook publicly backed her for the Labor leadership after Mark Latham resigned in 2005.

Death
Cook died on 3 December 2005 after being diagnosed with melanoma in July 2004. The last Senate report to which he contributed was The cancer journey: Informing choice, handed down on 23 June 2005.

References

1943 births
2005 deaths
Deaths from melanoma
Deaths from cancer in Victoria (Australia)
Australian Labor Party members of the Parliament of Australia
Members of the Cabinet of Australia
Members of the Australian Senate for Western Australia
Members of the Australian Senate
Politicians from Melbourne
20th-century Australian politicians
21st-century Australian politicians
Government ministers of Australia